The United States House of Representatives elections in California, 1918 was an election for California's delegation to the United States House of Representatives, which occurred as part of the general election of the House of Representatives on November 5, 1918. Democrats and Republicans swapped seats, leaving California's House delegation unchanged at 6 Republicans, 4 Democrats, and 1 Prohibition incumbent.

Overview

Results

District 1

District 2

District 3

District 4

District 5

District 6

District 7

District 8

District 9

District 10

District 11

See also 
66th United States Congress
Political party strength in California
Political party strength in U.S. states
United States House of Representatives elections, 1918

References 
California Elections Page
Office of the Clerk of the House of Representatives

External links 
California Legislative District Maps (1911-Present)
RAND California Election Returns: District Definitions

1918 California elections
1918
California United States House of Representatives